The lenticular fasciculus is a tract connecting the globus pallidus (internus) to the thalamus and is a part of the thalamic fasciculus. It is synonymous with field H2 of Forel. The thalamic fasciculus (composed of both the lenticular fasciculus and ansa lenticularis) runs to the thalamus. 
Basically, it is part of a pathway that connects the globus pallidus and the thalamus.

Lesions in this area can result in dyskinesias such as chorea-like movements.

External links
 https://web.archive.org/web/20070419222336/http://www.endotext.org/neuroendo/neuroendo3b/neuroendo3b_2.htm (see figure #12)
 https://web.archive.org/web/20080504234454/http://isc.temple.edu/neuroanatomy/lab/atlas/mdbg/

Brainstem
Thalamus